Marko Kovač may refer to:

 Marko Kovač (director) (born 1981), Serbian architect and film director
 Marko Kovač (footballer) (born 1987), Croatian footballer